"A Little Piece of Heaven" may refer to:

Film
A Little Piece of Heaven (film), a 1991 television film

Music
 "A Little Piece of Heaven", a song by Kevin Coyne from the 1980 album Bursting Bubbles
 "Little Piece of Heaven", a song by Charles & Eddie from the 1995 album Chocolate Milk and by The Neville Brothers on the 1999 album Valence Street
 "A Little Piece of Heaven", a song by Avenged Sevenfold on the 2007 album Avenged Sevenfold
 A Little Piece of Heaven, a 1993 album by Roger Ballard
 "A Little Piece of Heaven", a song by Godley & Creme from the 1988 album Goodbye Blue Sky